The Late Show is an American late-night talk show franchise on CBS. It first aired in August 1993 with host David Letterman, who previously hosted Late Night with David Letterman on NBC from 1982 to 1993. Letterman's iteration of the program ran until his retirement on May 20, 2015. Comedian Stephen Colbert, best known for his roles on Comedy Central programs The Daily Show and The Colbert Report, assumed hosting duties that September. The show originates from the Ed Sullivan Theater in the Theater District of Manhattan, New York, and airs live to tape in most U.S. markets at 11:35 p.m. Eastern and Pacific, 10:35 in the Central and Mountain time zones.

History

Prior to the Late Show
CBS had previously attempted late-night talk shows with The Merv Griffin Show (1969–1972) and The Pat Sajak Show (1989–1990) but neither were able to compete with NBC's The Tonight Show Starring Johnny Carson and were cancelled; Griffin's for editorial disputes with the network (he would go on to continue the show in syndication for 14 more years), and Sajak's for low ratings. For most of the 20 years preceding Late Show, CBS's late night fare consisted of movies, re-runs, imported Canadian dramas and specialty programming packaged under the titles CBS Late Night and Crimetime After Primetime and broadcast to middling ratings, competing against The Tonight Show and, in its last years, the upstart success of a syndicated series, The Arsenio Hall Show, which began airing in 1988. Before Letterman's arrival, CBS' New York flagship, WCBS-TV, specifically used the Late Show name for its late-night movie programming.

David Letterman (1993–2015)

When David Letterman became available after being passed over by NBC for The Tonight Show, CBS was eager to lure him and offered him a three-year, $14 million per year contract, doubling his Late Night salary. According to their agreement, the show would spend a month in Hollywood at least once a year.

CBS purchased the Ed Sullivan Theater for four million dollars, spending "several million more" for renovation. The renovation was supervised by architect James Polshek. CBS' total cost for acquiring the show—including renovations, negotiation right paid to NBC, signing Letterman, announcer Bill Wendell, band leader Paul Shaffer, and the rest of the band—was over $140 million.

When Letterman moved to CBS and began the Late Show, several of Late Nights long-running comedy bits made the move with him. Letterman renamed a few of his regular bits to avoid legal problems over trademark infringement (NBC cited that what he did on Late Night was "intellectual property" of the network, a contention he disputed). "Viewer Mail" on NBC became the "CBS Mailbag", and Larry "Bud" Melman began to use his real name, Calvert DeForest. Shaffer's "World's Most Dangerous Band" became "The CBS Orchestra", a jab at NBC regarding the show's new home, and a play on the NBC Orchestra of the long running The Tonight Show. Letterman's signature bit, the Top Ten List, was perfunctorily renamed the "Late Show Top Ten List" (over time it reverted to its original name).

In ratings, Letterman's Late Show topped Leno's Tonight Show for its first two years. Leno pulled ahead on July 10, 1995, starting with a Hugh Grant interview, after Grant's much-publicized arrest for picking up an LA prostitute. Leno also benefited from the lead-in provided by NBC's popular Must See TV prime time programs of the mid-to-late 1990s. Likewise the CBS network was hurt by affiliation switches in late 1994 relating to Fox picking up CBS's National Football League rights (although CBS would reacquire those rights in 1998), stunting the Late Show just as it was beginning to gain traction. Despite CBS rising back to first place in prime time in the 2000s, Letterman never fully recovered from the damage, and he remained behind Leno and successor Jimmy Fallon for the rest of his tenure, only briefly rising back to first place during Conan O'Brien's run as host of The Tonight Show.

Announcer Bill Wendell left in 1995, with Alan Kalter taking his place for the remainder of Letterman's run as host.

On April 3, 2014, Letterman announced his retirement. His last telecast aired on May 20, 2015.

CBS Summer Showcase – transition (May 21–September 7, 2015)
Instead of airing a transitional version of Late Show with guest hosts (as happened with The Late Late Show from January to March 2015 between the end of Craig Ferguson's show and the premiere of James Corden's) or reruns from Letterman's time as host (as NBC did during its interregnums on The Tonight Show and Late Night), CBS placed the Late Show on hiatus and instead aired reruns of scripted dramas in the 11:35 pm time slot over the summer with the branding CBS Summer Showcase. The network dismissed concerns that this may hurt the ratings of The Late Late Show with James Corden.

The plan was similar to CBS's pre-Letterman use of the slot for Crimetime After Primetime when police procedurals and mysteries aired in the slot in the early-1990s, and the late 1980s CBS Late Night which featured a mixture of scripted programming. Colbert would follow suit with a running gag on his first Late Show episode, showing CBS Corporation CEO Leslie Moonves with a giant switch which he could use to switch the network back to reruns of The Mentalist if he was dissatisfied with Colbert's performance (which he did, briefly, twice during the show).

Stephen Colbert (2015–present)

Stephen Colbert succeeded Letterman as host on September 8, 2015, having been signed to a five-year contract. In contrast with Colbert's previous program, The Colbert Report, in which he played a fictional character also named Stephen Colbert, Colbert hosts the show as himself. Colbert's version retains the Late Show name under license from Letterman's Worldwide Pants, which holds the registered trademark.

Several cities sought to acquire the Late Show, among them New York City, Los Angeles, New Orleans, and Connecticut. A report in the Daily News'' indicated that CBS Corporation had paid over $40,000 in campaign contributions to incumbent Governor Andrew Cuomo in an effort to lobby the governor for certain tax breaks to keep the show in New York City. A deal to keep the show at the Ed Sullivan Theater, which includes $16,000,000 in state tax incentives over a five-year period, was made official on July 23, 2014. Jon Batiste was the initial bandleader on Colbert's iteration of the program.

References

External links
Official website

 
Television franchises
1993 American television series debuts
1990s American late-night television series
2000s American late-night television series
2010s American late-night television series
1990s American variety television series
2000s American variety television series
2010s American variety television series
CBS late-night programming
English-language television shows
Television series by Worldwide Pants
Paramount Global franchises